Route 185 is a Connecticut state highway in the western Hartford suburbs, running from Simsbury to West Hartford.

Route description
Route 185 begins as Hartford Road at an intersection with US 202 and Route 10 in the Weatogue section of Simsbury. The road heads east across the Farmington River and turns southeast, passing by Talcott Mountain State Park then heading into the town of Bloomfield, where it becomes Simsbury Road. In Bloomfield, it passes the western end of Route 178 and continues generally southeast across the southwestern part of town into West Hartford. At the Bloomfield-West Hartford line, the road becomes four lanes wide as it intersects with Route 218. The road runs for another  in West Hartford as it continues southeast to end at an intersection with Route 189 near the University of Hartford.

History
In the 1920s, the Weatogue-Hartford route was a primary state highway known as Highway 115. It ran along modern Route 185 to Route 218 then used modern Route 218 to connect to modern US 44. Route 185 was established in 1932, running north–south from US 44 in West Hartford to the current western terminus. In 1935, Route 218 was established and took over the portion of modern Route 185 (former SR 920) east of modern Route 218. In 1963, the ends of Routes 185 and 218 were swapped resulting in the present configuration: the section south of the 185/218 junction was transferred to Route 218, and the section east of the junction was transferred to Route 185.

Junction list

References

External links

185
Transportation in Hartford County, Connecticut